Gary Aubuchon  (born July 10, 1962)  is a Cape Coral, Florida, real estate broker and  Republican politician who serves as the Representative from District 74 of the House of Representatives of the U.S. state of Florida. He was first elected to the Florida House in 2006 and won re-election in 2008. In 2009, he chaired the Health Care Services Policy Committee.

Aubuchon was born in Ferndale, Michigan, on July 10, 1962. In 1984, he earned a Bachelor of Arts degree in history from the  University of Michigan and moved to Florida the same year.

In 2009, Aubuchon's home construction business was involved in a controversy concerning homes that were built with defective Chinese drywall which rendered the homes unusable because of mold.

Aubuchon has not been the only builder faced with problems associated with Chinese drywall. The Florida Department of Health has established  (http://www.doh.state.fl.us/environment/community/indoor-air/drywall.html a website) to assist individuals whose homes have been constructed with tainted drywall.

Representative Aubuchon has been chairman of the Lee County Legislative Delegation since 2008. He has been recognized by the American Red Cross of Lee County for his devotion to humanitarianism. He was past-chairman of the Cape Coral Community Redevelopment Agency Board of Directors. He is a past-president of the Cape Coral Construction Industry Association, a member of the Community Foundation of Cape Coral and a supporter of the Ronald McDonald House.

References

Sources
Florida House of Representatives profile
Project Vote Smart profile

Republican Party members of the Florida House of Representatives
1962 births
Living people
21st-century American politicians
University of Michigan College of Literature, Science, and the Arts alumni
People from Ferndale, Michigan